Tomasz Gębala (born 23 November 1995) is a Polish handball player for Industria Kielce.

He participated at the 2017 World Men's Handball Championship.

Private life
His older brother Maciej Gębala is also a handball player.

References

1995 births
Living people
Sportspeople from Gdynia
Polish male handball players
Expatriate handball players
Polish expatriate sportspeople in Germany
SC Magdeburg players
Handball-Bundesliga players
Wisła Płock (handball) players
Vive Kielce players
21st-century Polish people